The Glenburn Hotel is a hotel located on Glenburn Road in Rothesay, Argyll and Bute, Scotland. It is a Category B listed building built in the first half of the 19th century. It opened for business in 1843. It was rebuilt, in ashlar stone, in 1892, on a grander scale, after a fire. It was originally Glenburn Hydropathic, Scotland's first spa. A brick chimney to the east of the property served the laundry and the steam heating.

The hotel, which has 121 bedrooms, is known colloquially, especially amongst the older generation, as the Hydro.

The Glenburn was extensively refurbished in 2016. It has been closed since November 2020 because of the COVID-19 pandemic, with staff initially being placed on furlough. In March 2022, it iwas announced that the hotel has been sold to the hotel group Bespoke Hotels for an undisclosed sum.

Gallery

See also
List of listed buildings in Argyll and Bute

References

External links
Official website

Hotels in Argyll and Bute
Category B listed buildings in Argyll and Bute
Listed hotels in Scotland
1843 establishments in Scotland
Hotels established in 1843
Rothesay, Bute
Buildings and structures completed in 1892